Phillips v. Martin Marietta Corp., 400 U.S. 542 (1971), was a United States Supreme Court landmark case in which the Court held that under Title VII of the Civil Rights Act of 1964, an employer may not, in the absence of business necessity, refuse to hire women with pre-school-age children while hiring men with such children. It was the first sex discrimination case under Title VII to reach the Court.

Background 
The Martin Marietta Corporation had a policy which did not allow the hiring of mothers with pre-school aged children because they were assumed to be unreliable employees; Ida Phillips, a mother, applied for a job at the company and was denied because of her circumstance as a mother. Phillips sued under Title VII claiming that the policy was discriminatory.

Opinion of the Court 
The Supreme Court unanimously held that the Marietta Corp. policy did discriminate on the basis of sex and overturned the lower court’s finding, then sent the case back to the lower court for trial. In sending this case back, the Court suggested that the employer may be able to justify the discrimination using the Bona fide occupational qualifications (BFOQ) Exception.

References

External links
 

United States Supreme Court cases
1987 in United States case law
Lockheed Martin
United States Supreme Court cases of the Rehnquist Court
United States gender discrimination case law
History of women in the United States
Maternity in the United States